is a Japanese mixed martial artist. He was the former DEEP Lightweight Champion.

Background
Kikuno started his martial arts training with judo when he was in high school, and was able to take third place in the Kyushu 66 kg tournament and first in Kagoshima Prefecture 66 kg tournament. After graduating from high school Kikuno took up Kyokushin Karate where he took first in the all Kyushu Tournament and a best 16 spot in the middle division of an All-Japan Tournament, Kikuno was trained under Hitoshi Kiyama. He joined Tsuyoshi Kohsaka’s A-Square MMA team in 2004 and began his career in 2005.

Mixed martial arts

Deep
Kikuno made his professional mixed martial arts debut in Japanese promotion DEEP's Future King Tournament 2005 defeating Hitoki Tsuti via doctor stoppage and Masashi Takeda via knockout.

At the 2009 DEEP Lightweight Tournament Kikuno became champion after defeating Koichiro Matsumoto via knockout.

Dream
Kikuno signed with the DREAM promotion after becoming DEEP Lightweight Champion and made his debut against Andre Dida at Dream 10 on July 20, 2009. Kikuno defeated Dida via a flurry of punches, winning his DREAM debut.

Ultimate Fighting Championship
Kikuno faced Quinn Mulhern on January 4, 2014, at UFC Fight Night 34. He won the fight via unanimous decision.

In his second fight with the promotion, Kikuno faced Tony Ferguson on May 24, 2014, at UFC 173. He lost the fight via knockout in the first round.

Kikuno faced Sam Sicilia at UFC Fight Night 52 on September 20, 2014. He won the fight via submission in the second round.

Kikuno faced Kevin Souza on March 21, 2015, at UFC Fight Night 62. He lost the fight via knockout in the first round.

Kikuno faced Diego Brandão on September 27, 2015, at UFC Fight Night 75. He lost the fight via technical knockout in the first round and was subsequently released from the promotion.

Championships and accomplishments
DEEP
DEEP Lightweight Championship (One time)
One successful title defense
DEEP Lightweight Championship Tournament Winner
2005 DEEP Future King Tournament Winner

Mixed martial arts record

|-
| Win
| align=center| 24–8–2
| Takuya Oyama
| TKO (punches)
| DEEP- 76 Impact
| 
|align=center|2
|align=center|4:46
| Tokyo, Japan
|
|-
|Loss
| align=center| 23–8–2
| Diego Brandão
| TKO (punches)
| UFC Fight Night: Barnett vs. Nelson
| 
| align=center|1
| align=center|0:28
| Saitama, Japan
| 
|-
| Loss
| align=center| 23–7–2
| Kevin Souza
| KO (punch)
| UFC Fight Night: Maia vs. LaFlare
| 
|align=center|1
|align=center|1:31
| Rio de Janeiro, Brazil
|
|-
| Win
| align=center| 23–6–2
| Sam Sicilia
| Submission (rear-naked choke)
| UFC Fight Night: Hunt vs. Nelson
| 
| align=center| 2
| align=center| 1:38
| Saitama, Japan
| 
|-
| Loss
| align=center| 22–6–2
| Tony Ferguson
| KO (punch)
| UFC 173
| 
| align=center| 1
| align=center| 4:06
| Las Vegas, Nevada, United States
| 
|-
| Win
| align=center| 22–5–2
| Quinn Mulhern
| Decision (unanimous)
| UFC Fight Night: Saffiedine vs. Lim
| 
| align=center| 3
| align=center| 5:00
| Marina Bay, Singapore
| 
|-
| Win
| align=center| 21–5–2
| Yong Jae Lee
| Submission (rear-naked choke)
| Deep: 63 Impact
| 
| align=center| 1
| align=center| 4:12
| Tokyo, Japan
| 
|-
| Win
| align=center| 20–5–2
| Jutaro Nakao
| KO (punch)
| Deep: Cage Impact 2013
| 
| align=center| 1
| align=center| 1:07
| Tokyo, Japan
| 
|-
| Win
| align=center| 19–5–2
| Takafumi Ito
| KO (palm strike)
| U-Spirits Again
| 
| align=center| 1
| align=center| 0:29
| Tokyo, Japan
| 
|-
| Win
| align=center| 18–5–2
| Luiz Andrade I
| KO (punch)
| Deep: Cage Impact 2012 in Tokyo: Semifinals
| 
| align=center| 1
| align=center| 0:08
| Tokyo, Japan
| 
|-
| Win
| align=center| 17–5–2
| Yasuaki Kishimoto
| Decision (unanimous)
| Deep: 60 Impact
| 
| align=center| 3
| align=center| 5:00
| Tokyo, Japan
| 
|-
| Loss
| align=center| 16–5–2
| Satoru Kitaoka
| Decision (unanimous)
| Deep: 58 Impact
| 
| align=center| 3
| align=center| 5:00
| Tokyo, Japan
| 
|-
| Win
| align=center| 16–4–2
| Kwang Hee Lee
| TKO (punches)
| Deep: Cage Impact 2011 in Tokyo, 1st Round
| 
| align=center| 1
| align=center| 4:59
| Tokyo, Japan
| 
|-
| Loss
| align=center| 15–4–2
| Mizuto Hirota
| Decision (unanimous)
| Deep: 55 Impact
| 
| align=center| 3
| align=center| 5:00
| Tokyo, Japan
| 
|-
| Win
| align=center| 15–3–2
| Daisuke Nakamura
| Decision (unanimous)
| Dream: Fight for Japan!
| 
| align=center| 3
| align=center| 5:00
| Tokyo, Japan
| 
|-
| Win
| align=center| 14–3–2
| Nobuhiro Obiya
| Decision (split)
| Deep: 50 Impact
| 
| align=center| 3
| align=center| 5:00
| Tokyo, Japan
| 
|-
| Loss
| align=center| 13–3–2
| Gesias Cavalcante
| Decision (split)
| Dream 15
| 
| align=center| 2
| align=center| 5:00
| Saitama, Japan
| 
|-
| Win
| align=center| 13–2–2
| Kuniyoshi Hironaka
| KO (punch)
| Dream 13
| 
| align=center| 1
| align=center| 1:26
| Yokohama, Japan
| 
|-
| Loss
| align=center| 12–2–2
| Eddie Alvarez
| Submission (arm-triangle choke)
| Dream 12
| 
| align=center| 2
| align=center| 3:42
| Osaka, Japan
| 
|-
| Win
| align=center| 12–1–2
| Andre Amade
| TKO (punches)
| Dream 10
| 
| align=center| 1
| align=center| 3:47
| Saitama, Japan
| 
|-
| Win
| align=center| 11–1–2
| Koichiro Matsumoto
| KO (punch)
| Deep: 41 Impact
| 
| align=center| 1
| align=center| 4:32
| Tokyo, Japan
| 
|-
| Win
| align=center| 10–1–2
| Jung Bu-Kyung
| TKO (body kick and soccer kicks)
| Deep: 40 Impact
| 
| align=center| 1
| align=center| 4:15
| Tokyo, Japan
| 
|-
| Win
| align=center| 9–1–2
| Jang Yong Kim
| Decision (unanimous)
| Deep: 39 Impact
| 
| align=center| 2
| align=center| 5:00
| Tokyo, Japan
| 
|-
| Win
| align=center| 8–1–2
| Yoshihiro Tomioka
| TKO (punches)
| Deep: 37 Impact
| 
| align=center| 2
| align=center| 2:34
| Tokyo, Japan
| 
|-
| Win
| align=center| 7–1–2
| Seigo Inoue
| Decision (unanimous)
| Deep: 35 Impact
| 
| align=center| 2
| align=center| 5:00
| Tokyo, Japan
| 
|-
| Win
| align=center| 6–1–2
| Takuhiro Kamikozono
| Decision (majority)
| Deep: 29 Impact
| 
| align=center| 2
| align=center| 5:00
| Tokyo, Japan
| 
|-
| Win
| align=center| 5–1–2
| Hiroki Nagaoka
| Decision (majority)
| Deep: 27 Impact
| 
| align=center| 2
| align=center| 5:00
| Tokyo, Japan
| 
|-
| Win
| align=center| 4–1–2
| Hiroshi Kobayashi
| Submission (rear-naked choke)
| Deep: 26 Impact
| 
| align=center| 1
| align=center| 3:26
| Tokyo, Japan
| 
|-
| Draw
| align=center| 3–1–2
| Luiz Andrade I
| Draw
| Deep: clubDeep Tokyo
| 
| align=center| 2
| align=center| 5:00
| Tokyo, Japan
| 
|-
| Win
| align=center| 3–1–1
| Ichiro Kojima
| TKO (punches)
| ZST: Swat! 5
| 
| align=center| 1
| align=center| 1:18
| Tokyo, Japan
| 
|-
| Loss
| align=center| 2–1–1
| Yukinari Tamura
| Decision (unanimous)
| Deep: 23 Impact
| 
| align=center| 2
| align=center| 5:00
| Tokyo, Japan
| 
|-
| Win
| align=center| 2–0–1
| Masashi Takeda
| KO (punch)
| Deep: Future King Tournament 2005
| 
| align=center| 1
| align=center| 2:30
| Tokyo, Japan
| 
|-
| Win
| align=center| 1–0–1
| Hitoki Tsuti
| TKO (doctor stoppage)
| Deep: Future King Tournament 2005
| 
| align=center| 1
| align=center| 5:00
| Tokyo, Japan
| 
|-
| Draw
| align=center| 0–0–1
| Junpei Chikano
| Draw
| ZST 8
| 
| align=center| 1
| align=center| 5:00
| Tokyo, Japan
|

Mixed martial arts exhibition record

|-
| Win
| align=center| 1–0
| Yuichiro Nagashima
| TKO (punches)
| Fight For Japan: Genki Desu Ka Omisoka 2011
| 
| align=center| 2
| align=center| 2:34
| Chuo-ku, Saitama City, Japan
|

See also
 List of current UFC fighters
 List of male mixed martial artists

References

External links
 
 

Living people
1981 births
Japanese male mixed martial artists
Lightweight mixed martial artists
Japanese male judoka
Japanese male karateka
Mixed martial artists utilizing Kenpo
Mixed martial artists utilizing Kyokushin kaikan
Mixed martial artists utilizing judo
Featherweight mixed martial artists
Deep (mixed martial arts) champions
Ultimate Fighting Championship male fighters
People from Kagoshima
Sportspeople from Kagoshima Prefecture